The White River Ash is a 1,200-year-old ash deposit. It was formed by two large (VEI 6) explosive eruptions from the stratovolcano of Mount Churchill that occurred around 850 AD and blanketed  of Yukon and Northwest Territories, Canada and the U.S. state of Alaska with ash. Traces of the ash has been identified in Ireland and Northern Europe.

See also
Volcanism of Canada
Volcanism of Northern Canada

References
Transatlantic distribution of the Alaskan White River Ash

Volcanism of Alaska
Volcanism of Yukon
Volcanism of the Northwest Territories
Holocene volcanism
VEI-6 eruptions
Volcanic eruptions in the United States